Jordan Blilie (born June 10, 1981) is the American vocalist for the bands Past Lives and Head Wound City, best known as the co-lead vocalist and co-lyricist for The Blood Brothers, from 1997 until their breakup in 2007.

Blilie is married to Zoë Verkuylen, a Canadian artist manager and tour manager, formerly of The Red Light Sting.

His twin sister Hannah Blilie is the drummer for the band Gossip.

References

Place of birth missing (living people)
Living people
American punk rock singers
Musicians from Seattle
The Blood Brothers (band) members
Head Wound City members
1981 births